Law reform or legal reform is the process of examining existing laws, and advocating and implementing change in a legal system, usually with the aim of enhancing justice or efficiency.

Intimately related are law reform bodies or law commissions, which are organizations set up to facilitate law reform. Law reform bodies carry out research and recommend ways to simplify and modernize the law. Many law reform bodies are statutory corporations set up by governments, although they are usually independent from government control, providing intellectual independence to accurately reflect and report on how the law should progress.

Law reform activities can include preparation and presentation of cases in court in order to change the common law; lobbying of government officials in order to change legislation; and research or writing that helps to establish an empirical basis for other law reform activities.

The four main methods in reforming law are repeal (get rid of a law), creation of new law, consolidation (change existing law) and codification.

Definition
The expression "law reform" is used in a number of senses and some of these are close to being wholly incompatible with each other.

In the Law Reform Commission Act 1975, the expression "reform" includes, in relation to the law or a branch of the law, its development, its codification (including in particular its simplification and modernisation) and the revision and consolidation of statute law, and kindred words must be construed accordingly.

Correlation with judicial reform
Judicial reform is the complete or partial political reform of a country's judiciary. Judicial reform is often done as a part of wider reform of the country's political system or a legal reform. The President of the Constitutional Court of the Russian Federation, Valery Zorkin, gives in his article, "Twelve Theses on Legal Reform in Russia", first published in Russian magazine Legislation and Economics, N. 2, 2004 an explained correlation between legal and judicial reform: "Complete legal reform should normally include not only judicial reform, but also reform of various aspects of the structural system and content of legislation, legal education, legal awareness by the population, and also the corporate consciousness of the whole legal community. Judicial reform usually aims to improve such things as law courts, procuracies, advocacy (bar), inquest, executory processes, and record keeping." .

Relation with economics
Legal reform can be the driver for all other reforms, including reform of the economy. A true market economy cannot be created without ensuring both full guarantees of private property and transparent predictability for entrepreneurial activity, on the one hand; and sufficiently reasonable legal control over economic processes, on the other hand. Legal reform should be an integral part of any on-going reform process. Legal reform is a tool for implementing necessary reforms, to balance competing interests, create a dynamic and sustainable economy, and build a sustainable civil society. During last decades the judiciary became active in economic issues related with economic rights established by constitution because "economics may provide insight into questions that bear on  the proper legal interpretation". Since many a country with a transitional political and economic system continues treating its constitution as an abstract legal document disengaged from the economic policy of the state, practice of judicial review of economic acts of executive and legislative branches became to grow.

The budget of the judiciary in many transitional and developing countries is completely controlled by the executive. The latter undermines the separation of powers, as it creates a critical financial dependence of the judiciary. The proper national wealth distribution including the government spending on the judiciary is subject of the constitutional economics.  It is important to distinguish between the two methods of corruption of the judiciary: the state (through budget planning and various privileges), and the private.

Russian example
In modern Russia, aspects and directions of development of judicial reform were formulated in the Judicial Reform Concept, enacted by the Russian Parliament on October 24, 1991. This document still remains legally valid and applicable.

Valery Zorkin stressed that "the separation of powers principle, also proclaimed in the Constitution of the Russian Federation, requires observance of judicial independence.  And such independence requires proper funding of the courts and their activities. It is well known that Russian courts remain under-funded.  However, the cumulative economic costs suffered by both state and private enterprises as the result of under-performance by various judicial institutions, especially by the courts of general jurisdiction and the arbitration courts, is at least twice the order of magnitude as the financial burden carried by the state and society in financing such judicial institutions. The elimination of under-funding of the courts would definitely improve the efficiency of their work and be worthwhile.

Taking into account the specifics of historical developments in Russia, one may assert that without undertaking a large-scale legal reform it would be extremely difficult to succeed concurrently with judicial reform. It is necessary now to start unfolding a full-scale legal reform, which has to be completed by the year 2020. The official public presentation and implementation of such legal reform should become the prime responsibility of executive and legislative authorities. The program of legal reform needs to be adopted in the form of a legislative act.

U.S. report, 2020
In April 2020, the National Center for State Courts and the Institute for the Advancement of the American Legal System issued a three-year report, "Transforming Our Civil Justice System for the 21st Century: The Road to Civil Justice Reform", which surmised that:

See also
Constitutionalism
Democratization
Deregulation
Drug policy reform
Judiciary
Independence of the judiciary
Liberalization
Land reform
Rule of law
Rule according to higher law

Notes

References
 "Economics and the Rule of Law" The Economist (2008-03-13).

External links

 
Philosophy of law